Black Buccaneer was a swinging pirate ship that operated at Chessington World of Adventures Resort in southwest London, England from 1988 to 2018 in the Pirates' Cove section of the park. After operating for 30 years, the ride has been replaced by Blue Barnacle in 2021.

History
Black Buccaneer was originally manufactured by Huss Rides in 1984, however opened at the park as Smugglers Galleon in 1988.

In 1998, the ride was rebranded to Black Buccaneer as it was most famously known.

The ride received a soundtrack in late 2013 and the surrounding buildings were refurbished in 2014.

During the 2016 season, frequent rainfall meant the motor underneath the ride flooded, causing the attraction to close for around a month.

For the start of the 2017 season, the ride received a new coat of paint and a single rider queue. From the start of the 2018 season until July, the attraction sat dismantled on land near Seastorm.

After spending the 2018 Winters Tail event operating the ride closed for normal winter maintenance, however at the start of the 2019 season it was announced as opening late alongside three other rides. Whilst the other rides opened after a month, Black Buccaneer remained in pieces and was not re-built.

It was eventually removed from the queue time boards, park app and website before Chessington confirmed on social media that the ride will not operate for at least the 2019 season.

After much speculation, it was announced the ride would be replaced for 2020 with a new ship called Blue Barnacle. Work, however, stopped due to the COVID-19 pandemic, delaying construction completion to April 2021.

Description
The ride was themed as a pirate ship and sat 45 riders per cycle in 9 rows of 5, before swinging back and forth at heights of up to 60 feet. It was painted black (hence the name) before later being changed to silver to expose any cracks.
Restrictions
You had to be a minimum of 1m tall to ride. Anyone under 1.3 meters had to be accompanied by an adult. In the 2016 season, a rule was added in which people 16 years or older had to be seated on the edges of each row, which meant anyone under 16 had to be seated in the middle. This saw queue times increase.

Gallery

References

External links

1988 establishments in England
2018 disestablishments in England
Chessington World of Adventures past rides
Amusement rides introduced in 1988
Amusement rides that closed in 2018
Former buildings and structures in the Royal Borough of Kingston upon Thames
Amusement rides manufactured by HUSS Park Attractions